This is a list of rivers originating in or transiting the Pacific Ranges, which are the southernmost of the three major subdivisions of the Coast Mountains in British Columbia, Canada.

Alfred Creek
Alouette River
Ashlu Creek
Atnarko River
Bella Coola River
Big Silver Creek
Birkenhead River
Brandywine Creek
Bridge River
Capilano River
Cayoosh Creek
Cheakamus River
Cheekye River
Chehalis River
Clendinning Creek
Clowhom River
Deserted River
Elaho River
Fitzsimmons Creek
Fraser River
Gates River
Green River
Harrison River
Haylmore Creek
Homathko River
Hurley River
Indian River
Kingcome River
Klinaklini River
Lillooet River
Lord River
Machmell River
Mamquam River
McGillivray Creek
Meager Creek
Nahatlatch River
Norrish Creek
Pitt River
Powell River
Rainy River
Ring Creek
River of Golden Dreams
Rubble Creek
Ruby Creek
Ryan River
Seton River
Seymour River
Skwawka River
Soo River
Southgate River
Squamish River
Stave River
Stein River
Tchaikazan River
Toba River
Tzoonie River
Vancouver River
Wannock River
West Klinaklini River
Yalakom River

See also
List of rivers of the Kitimat Ranges
List of rivers of the Boundary Ranges
List of rivers of the Canadian Rockies
List of rivers of the Omineca Mountains
List of rivers of the Rocky Mountains

Rivers of the Pacific Ranges
Pacific Ranges
 
Pacific Ranges
Rivers